The 2012 NCAA Women's Division I Swimming and Diving Championships were contested at the 31st annual NCAA-sanctioned swim meet to determine the team and individual national champions of Division I women's collegiate swimming and diving in the United States. 

This year's events were hosted by Auburn University at the James E. Martin Aquatics Center in Auburn, Alabama.

Defending champions California again topped the team standings, finishing 46.5 points (412.5–366) ahead of Georgia.  This was the Golden Bears' third women's team title.

Team standings
Note: Top 10 only
(H) = Hosts
(DC) = Defending champions
Full results

Swimming results

See also
List of college swimming and diving teams

References

NCAA Division I Swimming And Diving Championships
NCAA Division I Swimming And Diving Championships
NCAA Division I Women's Swimming and Diving Championships